Mark Garry Alvey (born 10 June 1980) is a former Australian rules football player who was drafted by the Western Bulldogs in the 1997 draft from the Bendigo U18s.  He is originally from Curlwaa in Southern New South Wales and earned a football scholarship to move to Bendigo at the age of 16.  A small player (height 176 cm), he was used mostly as a midfielder, rotating through the forward pocket.  He never managed to make it into the Western Bulldogs’ best 18 on a consistent basis, which is not surprising considering that his rivals for positions in that part of the ground during this period included Tony Liberatore, Scott West and Jose Romero.  He played 45 games in 6 seasons.

In 2004 he was picked up by Essendon Bombers in the draft where he managed 14 games in two seasons in a successful stint as a pseudo-full forward.

References
 Holmesby, Russell & Main, Jim (2002) The Encyclopedia of AFL Footballers, Crown Content, Melbourne.

External links

Australian rules footballers from New South Wales
Western Bulldogs players
Essendon Football Club players
1980 births
Living people
Bendigo Pioneers players